Evlalo is a village and a community in the Xanthi regional unit of Thrace, Greece. The municipal seat of Topeiros, it is located 23 kilometers south-southwest of the city of Xanthi. In 2011, the population was 922 for the village, and 4,985 for the community. The community consists of the villages Evlalo, Dekarcho, Iliokentima, Kremasti, Kyrnos, Mikrochori, Orfani and Palaio Olvio.

References

External links
Greek Travel Pages - Evlalo

Populated places in Xanthi (regional unit)